The Isiolo–Moyale Road is a road section of the A2 Road in Kenya, connecting the towns of Isiolo, Archers Post, Marsabit, and Moyale. The road is a component of the Lamu Port and Lamu-Southern Sudan-Ethiopia Transport Corridor (LAPSSET) Project. It connects Kenya to Ethiopia, its neighbor to the north.

Location
From there, the road travels in a general northerly direction though Archers Post, Merille, Marsabit, Turbi, to end at Moyale, at the international border with Ethiopia.

Overview
This road is an important trade corridor between Kenya and Ethiopia. It links four Kenyan counties and for the residents of these communities, it is a vital trade and transportation link to Nairobi and Mombasa, the two largest cities in the country.

The road is also a component of the Great North Trans African Highway, sometimes referred to as the Great North Road, that stretches from Cape Town, South Africa to Cairo, Egypt. This road has been identified as a priority project in the New Partnership for Africa's Development (NEPAD) short-term action plan.

Upgrade and funding

China Wu Yi, was the main contractor at a contract price of KSh42 billion (US$420 million). The financing for his road project, is as illustrated in the table below.

*Note: Totals may be slightly off due to rounding.

See also
 List of roads in Kenya
 East African Community

References

External links
 Webpage of the East African Community

Roads in Kenya
Geography of Kenya
Transport in Kenya
East African Community
Marsabit County
Samburu County
Meru County
Isiolo County